There are at least 28 named lakes and reservoirs in McCone County, Montana.

Lakes

Reservoirs

 Antelope Creek Reservoir, el. 
 Beery Reservoir, el. 
 Christianson Reservoir, el. 
 Dreyer Reservoir, el. 
 Dreyer Reservoir Number 2, el. 
 Fort Peck Lake, el. 
 Game Reservoir, el. 
 Gass Reservoir, el. 
 Goose Island Reservoir, el. 
 Groh Stock Reservoir, el. 
 Haynie Reservoir, el. 
 Hedstrom Lake, el. 
 Hell Gate Reservoir, el. 
 Hudiburgh Reservoir, el. 
 Jays Reservoir, el. 
 John Ball Reservoir, el. 
 Lake Fort Peck, el. 
 Leaky Reservoir, el. 
 Lisk Creek Reservoir, el. 
 McCloys Reservoir, el. 
 O'Dell Coulee Reservoir, el. 
 Quick Reservoir, el. 
 Quick Reservoir, el. 
 Switzer Reservoir, el. 
 Teds Reservoir, el. 
 Tveten Reservoir, el. 
 Upper O'Dell Coulee Reservoir, el. 
 Waters Reservoir, el.

See also
 List of lakes in Montana

Notes

Bodies of water of McCone County, Montana
McCone